Xintun is a township of Yi'an County in western Heilongjiang province, China, located  west-southwest of the county seat. , it has 9 villages under its administration.

See also 
 List of township-level divisions of Heilongjiang

References 

Township-level divisions of Heilongjiang